The fifth season of  Alarm für Cobra 11 – Die Autobahnpolizei aired between December 16, 1999 and March 24, 2000.

Format
Rene Steinke joined the cast.

Cast
 René Steinke - Tom Kranich
 Erdoğan Atalay - Semir Gerkhan

Episodes

1999 German television seasons
2000 German television seasons